Ophioglossolambis is a genus of sea snails, marine gastropod mollusks in the family Strombidae, the true conchs.

Species
Species within the genus Ophioglossolambis include:
Ophioglossolambis digitata (Perry, 1811)
Ophioglossolambis itsumiae Lum, 2021
Ophioglossolambis violacea (Swainson, 1821)

References

Strombidae